"Heaven Knows" is a song by American singer Donna Summer, with guest vocals from Brooklyn Dreams. It is a single from Summer's Live and More album. The song became a number 4 hit for Summer in the US the week of March 17, 1979, and held there for three weeks. It features the group Brooklyn Dreams with vocals by Joe "Bean" Esposito.

On the single version released by Summer (credited as Donna Summer with Brooklyn Dreams), Brooklyn Dreams singer Joe "Bean" Esposito sings second lead to Summer on the verses while Summer sings the chorus. However, on the version that appears on Brooklyn Dreams's 1979 album, Sleepless Nights, it is Esposito who sings the lead vocal on the verses with Summer singing second lead, and with Summer and the group provide backing vocals on the chorus. On the group's album, this version is credited as Brooklyn Dreams with Donna Summer.

A 12" single of Summer's version, at 6 minutes and 45 seconds, was released with the first verse sung by Summer solo, and the remaining verses with Summer and Esposito.

Cash Box said of Summers' single version that "Esposito has a deep shimmering voice while Donna reigns during soaring moments." Record World said that the song is "as polished as you'd expect."

Chart performance

Weekly charts

Year-end charts

Certifications and sales

References

External links
 

Donna Summer songs
Joe Esposito (singer) songs
1978 songs
1978 singles
1979 singles
Songs written by Pete Bellotte
Songs written by Giorgio Moroder
Songs written by Donna Summer
Casablanca Records singles
Song recordings produced by Giorgio Moroder
Song recordings produced by Pete Bellotte
Disco songs